Langhorne Creek (formerly Langhorne's Creek) is a town in South Australia. At the 2016 census, Langhorne Creek had a population of 427.

Wine Industry

Langhorne Creek has a wine history dating back to 1850. Traditionally a red wine growing district well known for production of outstanding Cabernet Sauvignon and Shiraz. These two red wine grape varieties constitute approximately 70% of the total vineyard plantings in the region. Over recent years, considerable experimentation has occurred and a wide range of grape varieties are now grown. The vineyards harvest from early March to late April.  The town is on the banks of the Bremer River which flows into Lake Alexandrina. In winter, the river frequently floods across the vineyards, contributing to the terroir of the region.

Features

The township has numerous places to eat: the Langhorne Creek General Store and The Bridge Hotel can be found on the main street of the town while the Angas Plains Estate, Bremerton and Lake Breeze cellar doors all offer lunch menus that go perfectly with a glass of wine. Additionally, The Winehouse is available to hire for functions and features a full kitchen. Langhorne Creek has seven cellar doors, all open seven days a week: Angas Plains Estate, Bremerton, Bleasdale, Lake Breeze, Rusticana, The Winehouse and Vineyard Road Cellar Door.

Frank Potts Reserve (named for the founder of the nearby Bleasdale winery) and Alfred Langhorne Park (for one of the cattle-droving brothers Alfred and Charles) are popular places to picnic and excellent areas to observe native flora and fauna.

Sport 
Despite its relatively small population, Langhorne Creek boasts a strong culture of success across a number of sports. Langhorne Creek fields teams in the following sports: Australian rules football, netball, cricket, tennis, lawn bowls and table tennis. The main venue for football, cricket, netball, tennis and lawn bowls is Langhorne Creek Memorial Park which is located at Murray Road, Langhorne Creek. The Langhorne Creek Table Tennis Club plays its matches at the Langhorne's Creek Memorial Hall.

The Langhorne Creek Football Club was established in 1906 and currently competes in the Great Southern Football League. Known as the Hawks, Langhorne Creek Football Club has enjoyed a sustained period of success since 2000 having won the GSFL A Grade premiership six times (2001, 2002, 2011, 2012, 2018, 2019) and has consistently been among the strongest clubs in the region during that time while being the smallest club.

The Langhorne Creek Cricket Club was established in 1889 and joined the Alexandra Cricket Association as a foundation member in 1908. It currently competes in the Alexandra & Eastern Hills Cricket Association winning three premierships (2003/04, 2006/07, 2018/19) since the league formed in 1983/84. With a relatively round oval, a turf wicket, a new electronic scoreboard and a lovely outfield, it is a great place to play cricket. The LCCC has three senior teams and three junior teams and are known as the "Tigers".

Notes and references

External links
Langhorne Creek Wine Industry Council Inc. website
Langhorne Creek Wine Region South Australian Tourism Bureau homepage

Towns in South Australia